Mačkovec pri Dvoru ( or) is a village in the Municipality of Žužemberk in southeastern Slovenia. It lies on the left bank of the Krka River just north of Dvor. The area is part of the historical region of Lower Carniola. The municipality is now included in the Southeast Slovenia Statistical Region. The settlement includes the formerly independent village of Brod.

Name
The name of the settlement was changed from Mačkovec to Mačkovec pri Dvoru in 1953.

Church
The local church is dedicated to Saint John the Evangelist and belongs to the Parish of Žužemberk. It is a medieval building that was restyled in the Baroque style in the 18th century.

References

External links

Mačkovec pri Dvoru at Geopedia

Populated places in the Municipality of Žužemberk